Veur is a former municipality in the Dutch province of South Holland. It covered the northwestern part of the current town of Leidschendam.

Veur was a separate municipality between 1817 and 1938, when it merged with Stompwijk to form the new municipality of Leidschendam.

References

Former municipalities of South Holland